Francis Knight is the name of:

 the author of A Relation of Seven Yeares Slaverie Under the Turkes of Argeire, suffered by an English Captive Merchant, published in 1640 - see 1640s in piracy
 a High Sheriff of Bristol in 1579

See also
 Frank Knight (disambiguation)